Michael Richard Maskell (25 January 1952 – 4 May 2017) was an English football full back who made one appearance in the Football League for Brentford.

Playing career

Chelsea 
A full back, Maskell began his career in the youth system at First Division club Chelsea. He was a part of the first team squad for the 1969–70 season, but failed to make an appearance. He was released at the end of the season.

Brentford 
Maskell's former Chelsea youth team manager Frank Blunstone brought him to Fourth Division club Brentford in July 1970. Maskell made his professional debut in a 5–1 defeat to Oldham Athletic on 5 September 1970. It was his only appearance for the club and his contract was cancelled shortly afterwards, due to an alleged serious breach of discipline.

Stevenage Athletic 
After his release from Brentford, Maskell dropped into non-league football and signed for Southern League First Division club Stevenage Athletic.

Personal life 
Maskell's brother John was also a footballer.

Career statistics

References

1952 births
People from Eynsham
English footballers
Brentford F.C. players
English Football League players
Chelsea F.C. players
Stevenage Athletic F.C. players
Southern Football League players
Association football fullbacks
2017 deaths